Gullfaks is an oil and gas field in the Norwegian sector of the North Sea operated by Equinor. It was discovered in 1978, in block 34/10, at a water depth of 130-230 meters. It has satellite fields Gullfaks South, Rimfaks, Skinfaks and Gullveig.

Platforms
The project consists of three production platforms Gullfaks A (1986), Gullfaks B (1988), and Gullfaks C (1989). Gullfaks C holds the record  of the heaviest object that has ever been moved to another position, relative to the surface of the Earth with a total displacement between 1.4 and 1.5 million tons. The platform produces  of oil.

Incidents
Between November 2009 and May 2010 a well being drilled from Gullfaks C experienced multiple well control incidents which were investigated by Petroleum Safety Authority Norway and summarized in a report released on 19 November 2010. The report stated that only chance prevented the final and most serious incident on 19 May 2010 from becoming a full-scale disaster.

Geology
The reservoir consists of delta sandstones from the Middle Jurassic Brent Group, shallow-marine Lower Jurassic Cook Formation sandstones, and the fluvial-channel and delta-plain Lower Jurassic Statfjord Formation.

See also

2016 Turøy helicopter crash
List of tallest oil platforms

References

External links
 
 Gullfaks (Statoil website)
 Gullfaks facts and interactive map
 
 Offshore Technology

Equinor oil and gas fields
Natural gas fields in Norway
North Sea oil fields
Oil fields in Norway